Atlético v Cruzeiro (1927) was a state football game played on 27 November 1927. It was the bigger biggest win of the Clássico Mineiro, a derby about the 2 biggest clubs of the Minas Gerais state.

Details 

Man of the Match:
Mário de Castro (Atlético)

Source: Cruzeiropédia, Superesportes and Placar

References

External links
Superesportes: Atlético 9x2 Cruzeiro
Placar: Atlético 9x2 Cruzeiro

1927 Classico Mineiro
1927 Classico Mineiro
1927 in Brazilian football
Record association football wins